Urdorf is a municipality in the district of Dietikon in the canton of Zürich in Switzerland, located in the Limmat Valley (German: Limmattal).

Geography

Of this area, 32.2% is used for agricultural purposes, while 32.6% is forested. Of the rest of the land, 34.5% is settled (buildings or roads) and the remainder (0.7%) is non-productive (rivers, glaciers or mountains).   housing and buildings made up 25.9% of the total area, while transportation infrastructure made up the rest (8.8%). Of the total unproductive area, water (streams and lakes) made up 0.4% of the area.   26.2% of the total municipal area was undergoing some type of construction. In 1931 Niederurdorf and Oberurdorf were excluded from the Zürich District to form the municipality of Urdorf.

Demographics

, 18.9% of the population was made up of foreign nationals.   the gender distribution of the population was 49.3% male and 50.7% female. Over the last 10 years the population has grown at a rate of 1.4%. Most of the population speaks German  (85.7%), with Italian being second most common ( 3.6%) and Serbo-Croatian being third ( 2.1%).

In the 2007 election the most popular party was the SVP which received 40.4% of the vote.  The next three most popular parties were the SPS (21.1%), the FDP (10.8%) and the CVP (9.2%).

The age distribution of the population is children and teenagers (0–19 years old) make up 21.7% of the population, while adults (20–64 years old) make up 64.4% and seniors (over 64 years old) make up 13.9%.  In Urdorf about 77.4% of the population (between age 25-64) have completed either non-mandatory upper secondary education or additional higher education (either university or a Fachhochschule).  There are 4272 households in Urdorf.

Urdorf has an unemployment rate of 1.92%.  , there were 56 people employed in the primary economic sector and about 14 businesses involved in this sector.  1168 people are employed in the secondary sector and there are 116 businesses in this sector.  4303 people are employed in the tertiary sector, with 382 businesses in this sector.   33.3% of the working population were employed full-time, and 66.7% were employed part-time.

 there were 3332 Catholics and 3262 Protestants in Urdorf. From the 2000 census, 42.1% were some type of Protestant, with 39.8% belonging to the Swiss Reformed Church and 2.3% belonging to other Protestant churches.  37.4% of the population were Catholic. Of the rest of the population, 0% were Muslim, 6.2% belonged to another religion (not listed), 2.7% did not give a religion, and 11.1% were atheist or agnostic.

Transportation
The municipality is located on the A3 motorway.
The railway stations of Urdorf and Urdorf-Weihermatt are stops of the Zürich S-Bahn on the lines S9 and S15. Urdorf station is a 13-minute ride from Zürich Hauptbahnhof. Bus lines 302, 303, 308, 311, and 314 provide connections to neighbouring Dietikon, Schlieren, and Altstetten.

New Development
The Spitzacker Shopping Center has been renovated, now offering a significantly broadened range of quality for shoppers; construction of the residential will continue into 2015.

Notable people 
 Alina Pätz (born 1990 in Urdorf) a two-time World champion Swiss curler
 Marco Schönbächler (born 1990 in Urdorf) a Swiss professional footballer

References

External links 

  

Municipalities of the canton of Zürich